The 1991 NCAA Division I baseball season, play of college baseball in the United States organized by the National Collegiate Athletic Association (NCAA) began in the spring of 1991.  The season progressed through the regular season and concluded with the 1991 College World Series.  The College World Series, held for the forty fifth time in 1991, consisted of one team from each of eight regional competitions and was held in Omaha, Nebraska, at Johnny Rosenblatt Stadium as a double-elimination tournament.  LSU claimed the championship for the first time.

Realignment
Hardin–Simmons departed the Trans America Athletic Conference (TAAC) and NCAA Division I, reclassifying as NCAA Division III and joining the Texas Intercollegiate Athletic Association.
FIU joined the TAAC, departing the ranks of Independents.

Format changes
The Metro Conference dissolved their divisions and played as a single eight team conference.
The TAAC retained its divisions, but shifted Samford to the West Division.  FIU joined the East Division.

Conference winners
This is a partial list of conference champions from the 1991 season.  The NCAA sponsored regional competitions to determine the College World Series participants.  Each of the eight regionals consisted of six teams competing in double-elimination tournaments, with the winners advancing to Omaha.  25 teams earned automatic bids by winning their conference championship while 23 teams earned at-large selections.

Conference standings
The following is an incomplete list of conference standings:

College World Series

The 1991 season marked the forty fifth NCAA Baseball Tournament, which culminated with the eight team College World Series.  The College World Series was held in Omaha, Nebraska.  The eight teams played a double-elimination format, with LSU claiming their first championship with a 6–3 win over Wichita State in the final.

Award winners

All-America team

References